Zu jeder Stunde (English-language title: Always On Duty) is an East German black-and-white film, directed by Heinz Thiel. It was released in 1960.

Plot
Border Troops' soldier Martin arrives in a village on the Inner German border. He falls in love with a local girl, Renate. Their relationship is opposed to by her father, who promised her to the son of farmer Grabow. When Grabow plans to leave to the West with the aid of the corrupt officer Zimmer, Martin discovers their plans and informs his superiors, although Zimmer was his friend.

Cast
 Rolf Stövesand as Martin Kraft
 Erika Radtke as Renate Wedel
 Hans-Peter Minetti as Hermann Höhne
 Roman Silberstein as Heinz Tröger
 Manfred Borgesas Schlegel
 Erich Franz as Otto Grabow
 Otmar Richter as Felix Grabow
 Rolf Ripperger as Fred Wedel
 Hans Finohr as Arthur Wedel
 Fritz Diez as Father Kraft, the priest
 Werner Lierck as Köhler
 Josef Stauder as Schröder
 Horst Kube as Erich Willembrot
 Harry Hindemith as Marian Klein

Production
The DEFA Commission reviewed 58 scripts that were proposed for filming in the years 1959/60. Four of those were dubbed as "aesthetic films", and were all centered on portraying Christians as backward and reactionary. Out of the four, State Secretary of Cinema Erich Wendt authorized one script, that became the basis to Always on Duty. Although the picture was produced, the improvement in church and state relations in East Germany during 1960 prompted several changes in the plot, and the picture's antagonists were not presented as devout Catholics.

Reception
Miera and Antonin Liehm cited Zu Jeder Stunde as one of DEFA's "contemporary socialist films." The Der Monat journal's critic wrote that while viewing the film, "the public could be impressed by the alertness of the Border Troops." The German Film Lexicon regarded it as "unassuming, propagandistic, not persuading and artistically weak, as well as full of stereotypes."

References

External links
 
 Zu jeder Stunde on PROGRESS' website.
 Zu jeder Stunde original 1960 poster on ostfilm.de.

1959 films
DEFA films
1950s German-language films
German black-and-white films